Garrett Snuff Mill, also known as the George W. Helme Company, is a historic snuff tobacco mill complex located at Yorklyn, New Castle County, Delaware.  The complex includes 14 contributing buildings built between 1846 and 1901.  The buildings are architecturally unified as most are built of brick, with the two earliest mills constructed of stone. The Garrett family introduced the manufacture of snuff to Delaware.  The complex housed a snuff manufacturing operation until 1954.

It was listed on the National Register of Historic Places in 1978. The buildings were later incorporated into the Garrett Snuff Mills Historic District.

References

External links

Historic American Engineering Record in Delaware
Industrial buildings and structures on the National Register of Historic Places in Delaware
Buildings and structures in New Castle County, Delaware
Tobacco buildings in the United States
National Register of Historic Places in New Castle County, Delaware